Rakie Olufunmilayo Ayola (born May 1968) is a Welsh actress known for her work in theatre and television. Ayola has appeared in television shows including Black Mirror, Noughts + Crosses, Doctor Who, Silent Witness and EastEnders, a number of Shakespearean theatrical performances and feature films such as Great Moments in Aviation, The i Inside and Sahara. She appeared as Kyla Tyson in the BBC medical drama Holby City from its eighth to eleventh series.

In 2017, Ayola took over the role of Hermione Granger in the West End production of Harry Potter and the Cursed Child. In 2020, she won the Best Female Actor in a Play award at the Black British Theatre Awards for her performance in On Bear Ridge for National Theatre Wales and the Royal Court. In 2021, she won a BAFTA for her role in the BBC One drama Anthony.

Ayola is an advocate of increased ethnic representation in the entertainment industry, and in 2001 founded her own production company, producing the short film Persephone's Playground for the Cannes Film Festival in order to further her campaign.

Early life 
Ayola was born in Cardiff in May 1968 to a Sierra Leonean mother and a Nigerian father. She was raised by her mother's cousin and his wife in Ely, Cardiff. Ayola's heritage means she is Yoruba by descent, although she does not speak the language. Ayola studied at Windsor Clive Primary and Glan Ely High School, and was a member of the Orbit Youth Theatre, South Glamorgan Youth Theatre, South Glamorgan Youth Choir and the National Youth Theatre of Wales. She left high school before sitting her A Levels in order to pursue her ambition of becoming an actress. She explains: "I've always wanted to act. I decided at 16 I wanted to make my living acting, but even if I couldn't, I’d be in an amateur theatre company." She then went on to attend the Royal Welsh College of Music and Drama, studying for a three-year acting diploma. Her first acting role was for the Welsh Eisteddfod when still at primary school, playing a lady-in-waiting at the court of King Arthur. Ayola has stated that it was Barbra Streisand's performance in Hello, Dolly! that inspired her to act as a child, though credits her adoptive mother with encouraging her to act professionally. Ayola's first job was selling jeans on Bessemer Road Market in Cardiff. She worked as a chambermaid whilst attending drama school, and, six weeks prior to graduation, was offered a job with the 'Made in Wales' theatre company which enabled her to obtain her union card.

Career 
Ayola began her career in the theatre, performing in a number of Shakespearean plays including Twelfth Night, A Midsummer Night's Dream, The Tempest, The Merchant of Venice and Macbeth. She states of this: "Shakespeare keeps coming my way. I love the fact that I get to play people who are much more articulate than I'll ever be". In 1991 she played Hazel in John Godber's Up 'n' Under at the Sherman Theatre in Cardiff. Ayola has also performed in Twelfth Night in the lead roles of both Olivia and Viola. She explains: "The role of Viola didn't sit that well with me for some reason but Olivia makes more sense." She has also appeared in modern performances, assuming the title role of Dido, Queen of Carthage at the Globe Theatre in London in 2003, which she described as "a dream of a part". She has identified her dream role to be that of Isabella in Measure for Measure, as she once lost out on the part and would like to prove herself capable of playing it.

Ayola's first film appearance was in the 1993 film Great Moments in Aviation, written by Jeanette Winterson, in which she starred alongside Jonathan Pryce and John Hurt. Varietys David Rooney said of her performance: "In the film's most naturalistic turn, Ayola is a constant pleasure to watch. Unforced and appealing, she often succeeds in pulling the fanciful fireworks momentarily back down to Earth." Ayola recalls having been daunted at the prospect of working alongside so many established names, but has said it was a "wonderful experience". Her subsequent film credits are romantic comedy The Secret Laughter of Women, set in Nigeria and starring Colin Firth, thriller The i Inside, filmed in Sully Hospital, Cardiff, and starring Ryan Phillippe, and Sahara, filmed in Morocco whilst Ayola was pregnant with her first child, starring Penélope Cruz. Ayola says of her film career: "I really like doing film [but] I've not done enough big films though to really know the difference between film and television."

Ayola's first major television role was in the ITV drama Soldier Soldier, in which she starred throughout its third series in 1993 as soldier's wife Bernie Roberts. Ayola credits her chemistry with co-star Akim Mogaji, who played her on-screen husband Luke Roberts, for winning her her audition. She went on to appear in Gone With the Wind sequel Scarlett, and star in Welsh soap opera Tiger Bay. She has spoken critically of the way the BBC treated the soap, moving it around the schedules and declining to commission a second series. She acted alongside Pauline Quirke in both Maisie Raine and Being April, deeming Quirke to be a "fantastic" actress, and one she would work alongside again "like a shot". In 1996, Ayola appeared at the National Theatre in Helen Edmundson's adaptation of Leo Tolstoy's War and Peace. In 2001, she became a presenter of the BBC Wales arts programme Double Yellow, alongside poet Owen Sheers and performance artist Mark Rees. She posed nude but for a pair of yellow rubber gloves to promote the show's launch, and was highly critical of the BBC when the show was cancelled midway through its second series. She has since concluded that "the kind of audience they would like to bring in with shows like Double Yellow aren't really into watching TV", but at the time was outspoken against the show's cancellation, stating:

Ayola's other notable television appearances include the BBC psychological thriller Green-Eyed Monster (2001), soap opera EastEnders (2001), Waking the Dead (2001), London's Burning (2001), Offenders (2002), Murder in Mind (2003), The Canterbury Tales (2003) and Sea of Souls (2004). In 2008, she starred in the Doctor Who episode "Midnight", playing an intergalactic Hostess alongside David Tennant's Tenth Doctor. In 2009, Ayola starred in the CBBC musical comedy My Almost Famous Family. She stated: "The script made me laugh out loud when I read it. [...] I also like the fact that there were a lot of correct boxes being ticked, but the writers and producer haven't been restrained by that. "So, instead of bowing to this altar, they've said, 'Okay, we have this family that's half-black, half-white, half-American, half-British. We have a mix of boys and girls, one character who's mixed-raced and deaf – but we're not going to be restrained by any of that. We're not going to tiptoe around Martha's disability or anything.' I liked that. It wasn't some sort of reverential hands-off approach to what we're presenting." She has also been cast in the film Dredd. In 2016 she played Amber Haleford in "Tuesday's Child", S6:E2 of Vera.   She joined the cast of Harry Potter and the Cursed Child at the Palace Theatre, London from 24 May 2017, playing the role of Hermione Granger.

In 2020, she won the Best Female Actor in a Play award at the Black British Theatre Awards for her performance in On Bear Ridge for National Theatre Wales and the Royal Court.

Holby City 
From 7 February 2006 to 9 December 2008, Ayola starred in BBC medical drama Holby City as nurse Kyla Tyson. She had previously appeared in Holby City sister show Casualty, and had made an appearance in Holby City fifth series as patient Marianne Lawson. She was approached about returning to the show in a more permanent role by BBC casting director Julie Harkin. After a series of three meetings, a year after the birth of her first child, she agreed to assume the role of Kyla, despite being "nervous about signing such a long contract", stating: "I've been someone who's loved the uncertainty of acting. I've loved that one month it's Sahara in Morocco and the next I'm doing a stage play, then it's a six-part telly thing. But last summer I started thinking it would be really nice not to have to look for a job every couple of weeks. It would be nice just to stay put for a while. If I'm going to be a working mum I'd rather just be one rather than be one intermittently. And then Holby came along, so I'm very grateful".

Ayola signed a three-year contract to play Kyla, and described herself as "very similar" to her character, speaking positively about her working relationship with co-stars Jaye Jacobs and Sharon D. Clarke, as well as the "dream" storylines her character was given. She said of the show:

"I really love Holby and I'm surprised how much. What thrills me about Holby is that you get back what you put in. The powers that be are only as interested in you as they think you are in the job. For me it's about more than turning up and saying the lines. It's about understanding it and trying to make it better. That's actually a lot of fun. What's great is nobody says, 'Just shut up.' They want you to work at it. [...] I surprise myself sometimes because after two and a half years sometimes I see friends on the side of a poster and I think, 'do I want to do something else?' but I really like this job, I never get that awful 'dread' feeling when you really don’t want to go into work."

In October 2008, Ayola announced that she would be departing from Holby City in order to have a second child, stating: "I've had a great time and I'll miss it. I made the decision purely because I was pregnant, but I wasn't really ready to put down the character of Kyla. I'm very sorry to have to let her go."

Race and charity work
Throughout her career, Ayola has been outspoken on the subject of racial discrimination in the entertainment industry. Describing her motivation, she states: "I am not an overtly political person. I just want fairness". Ayola believes that black actors receive less recognition than their white counterparts, explaining; "If you get a show with six stars and one is black you are more likely to see interviews with the five white actors. [...] They are not being sold as a reason to watch." She believes that her career would have taken her in a different direction were she not Black, stating: "I could not have played any of the roles I have played on TV if I was white [...] I am very aware of where the glass ceiling is and it's still very low and expectations are still very low". She has noted having casting directors accept the notion of characters being both black and Welsh to be a particular problem, explaining that: "I get offered a lot of very different roles, but they're never Welsh. [...] The one time I was asked to play a Welsh character on screen was in Tiger Bay for BBC Wales, but I know if that series had been called Radyr Park or Cyncoed Close I wouldn't have been in it". In 2001, Ayola founded a production company and directed a short film entitled Persephone's Playground. She presented the film at the Cannes film festival, using it as part of her campaign for increased black representation in theatre, films and television. The project, however, was largely unsuccessful, with Ayola stating: "it just made me decide that if there's anything I don't want to do, it's produce films, because I'm rubbish at it. I was so bad with the budget that I just said yes to everything and then had to worry about how to pay for things at the end." In 2008, Ayola offered her support to the Action for Southern Africa campaign Dignity! Period, aiming to provide affordable sanitary protection to Zimbabwean women.

Awards 
Ayola was nominated and shortlisted for the 'Female Performance in TV' award in the 2006 Screen Nation Awards, for her role as Kyla Tyson in Holby City. She received Honourable Mention for the same role the following year, and was shortlisted again in 2008. In 2005, WalesOnline voted Ayola the 29th sexiest woman in Wales, saying of her: "One of our favourite thesps, she's black, beautiful and the term "yummy mummy" should have been made for her." She placed 40th in 2008, with the Western Mail noting: "the last 15 years have only seen Rakie become more beautiful and more successful". Ayola placed 17th in the awards in 2009.
Rakie is a Trustee of ACT, the Actors' Children's Trust, and an Ambassador of PIPA, Parents in Performing Arts.

Personal life 
Ayola describes herself as "optimistic, cynical, lazy, naive [and] honest". She spends her free time "watching television, the theatre, cinema, concerts, indoor wall climbing [and] keeping fit [with] yoga [and] aerobics". She has a collection of Troll dolls which she keeps under her bath. Ayola has an interest in travel, and has visited Peru and Kenya among other destinations. She has expressed a desire to visit Brazil and Argentina, and has "a romantic notion of travelling around Europe in a camper van". Ayola often speaks of her pride in her Welsh upbringing, describing herself as "an Ely girl through and through". She was made a Fellow of the Royal Welsh College of Music and Drama in 2003.

During a 1998 production of Hamlet, Ayola met her future husband, fellow actor Adam Smethurst – son of Love Thy Neighbour star Jack Smethurst. They met again two years later, during a production of Twelfth Night, and went on to become a couple. The pair married in May 2004, and Ayola gave birth to their first daughter, Tansy, in July that year. Their second daughter, Shani, was born in January 2009.

Filmography 
Ayola has undertaken the following roles from her screen and televisual debut in 1993, to the present day.

Film roles

Television roles

Video games

References

External links 
 

Living people
1968 births
20th-century Welsh actresses
21st-century Welsh actresses
Alumni of the Royal Welsh College of Music & Drama
Actresses from Cardiff
Best Supporting Actress BAFTA Award (television) winners
Black British actresses
Welsh people of Nigerian descent
Welsh people of Sierra Leonean descent
Welsh people of Yoruba descent
Welsh television actresses
Yoruba actresses